The 2018 Hassanal Bolkiah Trophy is the sixth edition of the invitational tournament hosted by Brunei, taking place from 23 April to 5 May. A total of 7 teams of the under-22 age group from the Southeast Asian region will be competing for the trophy along with a cash prize of B$20,000 (US$15,200) for the winners, B$10,000 (US$7,600) for the runner-up and B$5,000 (US$3,800) for joint third-place.

Teams were divided into two groups, with the host nation able to choose which group to be placed in. The draw took place on 21 March with Brunei electing to choose Group A. Indonesia could not join due to the 2018 PSSI Anniversary Cup, while Malaysia, Philippines and Vietnam are not participating due to tight football league schedules in their countries.

Timor-Leste emerged as the champion after beating Cambodia by 1–0 in the final, while both Myanmar and Singapore shared the third place.

Venues

Match officials 
The following referees were chosen for the tournament.

Referees

  Amidillah Zainuddin
  Payam Heidari
  Ahmad Yaqoub Ibrahim
  Dmitry Mashentsev
  Suhaizi Shukri
  Mongkolchai Pechsri

Squads

Group stage

Group A

Group B

Knockout stage

Semi-finals

Final

Goalscorers 
3 goals

  Phithack Kongmathilath
  Ikhsan Fandi

2 goals

  Narong Kakada
  Sos Suhana
  Hein Htet Aung
  Rusyaidi Salime
  Henrique Cruz
  Rufino Gama

1 goal

  Nazirrudin Ismail
  Yura Indera Putera Yunos
  Win Naing Tun
  Zin Min Tun
  Hami Syahin Said
  Pithak Phaphirom
  Sirimongkol Tungcharoennuruk
  Sittichok Paso
  José Oliveira

Own goal

  Soeuy Visal (for Myanmar)

Team statistics 
As per statistical convention in football, matches decided in extra time are counted as wins and losses, while matches decided by penalty shoot-outs are counted as draws.

References

External links 
 Official Programme Book

 
2018 in Asian football
2018
2018 in Brunei football
2018 in Burmese football
2018 in Laotian football
2018 in Singaporean football
2018 in Thai football
2018 in East Timorese sport
2018 in Cambodian football